Provodovice is a municipality and village in Přerov District in the Olomouc Region of the Czech Republic. It has about 200 inhabitants.

Etymology
The name is derived from the personal name Provod, meaning "the village of Provod's people".

Geography
It lies in the Moravian-Silesian Foothills. The Juhyně Stream flows along the western and northern municipal border.

History
The first written mention of Provodovice is from 1302.

Sights
There are no major sights. The only monuments are two wayside crosses and a statue of Saint John of Nepomuk.

References

External links

Villages in Přerov District